The Man Is Dead is the first EP recorded and released by Australian four-piece musical group The Jezabels. It was released independently on 3 February 2009 through MGM Distribution.

Track listing
All tracks written by Hayley Mary, Heather Shannon, Sam Lockwood, and Nik Kaloper

References

2009 debut EPs
The Jezabels albums